A Jefferson–Jackson Dinner is a title traditionally given to an annual fundraising celebration held by Democratic Party organizations in the United States. It is named for Presidents Thomas Jefferson and Andrew Jackson, which the party traditionally calls its founders.  They are usually held at a local level where they are an opportunity for elected officials, candidates, party staff, advisors, and donors attend.

It is usually held in February or March.  The Republican Party's equivalent is usually called a Lincoln Dinner, Reagan Dinner, or Lincoln–Reagan Dinner.   Into the 1960s, state and local Democratic Parties across the country depended on well-attended Jefferson–Jackson Day dinners to provide their annual funding.  Their financial importance has somewhat dimmed since after the development of different fundraising strategies, although they still serve a function for social networking and conferences.

Change of name 
Due to controversies over Jefferson's slaveholding and Jackson's policy toward Native Americans while in office, some Democratic Party organizations have been removing Jefferson and Jackson from the title of party fundraisers. The flow of the State Democratic Parties seeking to change the name of their iconic Jefferson-Jackson dinner is spurred by a desire to embrace a more modern identity. The usual argument made is that while Jefferson and Jackson were both great men and for a time embodied the spirit of the Democratic Party, they now fail to represent the breadth of change that has affected the Democratic Party and its current membership.

Many state Democratic Parties have changed the traditional name. For example:
 In 2012, the Democratic Party of Mississippi initially renamed the dinner after civil rights leader Fannie Lou Hamer, with a Jefferson–Jackson–Hamer celebration, and subsequently renamed the dinner the Hamer-Winter Dinner after Hamer and former governor William Winter in 2018.
 Florida Democratic Party renamed their key dinner event "Leadership Blue."
 Missouri changed the name of their State Dinner to honor Missourian Harry Truman.
 Georgia has changed the name of their State Dinner.
 Iowa in August, 2015 voted to change the name of their Jefferson–Jackson Dinner.  It is now known as the Liberty and Justice Celebration.
 Nebraska Democrats host an annual Morrison Exon Dinner, named after former governors Frank B. Morrison and J. James Exon.
 As of 2016, Indiana Democrats have removed Jefferson and Jackson's names from the dinner, renaming the dinner the Hoosier Hospitality Dinner.
 The Minnesota Democratic-Farmer-Labor Party renamed theirs to the Humphrey-Mondale Dinner in 2012, after former Vice-Presidents Hubert Humphrey and Walter Mondale.
 Virginia Democrats renamed their dinner to the Blue Commonwealth Gala in 2018. 
 The North Carolina Democratic Party renamed their statewide dinner from Jefferson-Jackson to the Unity Dinner in 2017. Another party dinner for western North Carolina Democrats, the Vance-Aycock Dinner (named after former governors Zebulon Vance and Charles Aycock since 1960) was renamed the Western Gala in 2011, due to the fact that Vance was a Confederate veteran and Aycock led the Wilmington insurrection of 1898.
 The Texas Democratic Party renamed theirs to the Johnson-Jordan Dinner in 2014, honoring president Lyndon B. Johnson and congresswoman Barbara Jordan.

In the same way, the Republican party has moved away from "Lincoln Dinners" for the same reason due to the realignment in American politics since the 1960s, especially in the Southern United States where culturally conservative White Southerners now tend to be Republicans, while Black voters now tend to be Democrats.  As another example of the switch, the Democratic Obama administration led the effort to remove Andrew Jackson from the United States twenty-dollar bill, while Republican President Donald Trump praised Andrew Jackson as a populist hero who reminds him of himself, and personally delayed the effort.

See also
 Lincoln Dinner
 History of the Democratic Party (United States)

References

Democratic Party (United States)
Thomas Jefferson
Andrew Jackson
Annual events in the United States